"Dancing Through Life" is a musical number from the musical Wicked. It is sung between Fiyero, Elphaba (the Wicked Witch of the West) and Glinda, Nessarose (the Wicked Witch of the East), and Boq, as well as other cast members.

Context
The song is performed during the first act of the musical. Just prior to the song, Fiyero, the famed Winkie prince, arrives at Shiz University, where he meets Glinda (at this point known as Galinda) and Boq. During the song, Fiyero sings about his beliefs regarding the problem with schools, and believes that people should ignore school, and live the "unexamined life." Also during this song, Boq confesses to Galinda his infatuation with her, and asks her to save a dance for him, after Fiyero invites everyone to the "most swankified" place in town, the Ozdust Ballroom.

Upon hearing Boq, Galinda tells him that someone would be her hero if they asked Nessarose, the disabled sister of Elphaba, to the dance (inadvertently dooming Boq to becoming the Tin Woodman) in order to shake him off so she can spend the evening with Fiyero, with whom she has become infatuated. Nessarose is thrilled at the possibility of having a fun night at the Ozdust Ballroom, and begins her infatuation with Boq, hinting at later events to come in the musical. Elphaba is later given a black, pointed hat, by Galinda, who was originally given the hat by her grandmother. Galinda gives this hat to Elphaba to ridicule her in front of others, reminiscent of "What is This Feeling?". Nessarose and Elphaba try to find a way to repay Galinda.

During the ball, Madame Morrible confronts Galinda, and gives her a training wand, saying it was at the request of Elphaba that Galinda begin sorcery training, though Madame Morrible has doubts of Galinda's abilities. However, she gives Galinda the wand. Later, Elphaba arrives at the ball, wearing the hat, and begins to dance, alone. Soon filled with remorse, Galinda joins her, and eventually, so does much of the audience, beginning their friendship. Boq and Nessarose begin their relationship, though Boq is only willingly participating to impress Galinda.

Lyrics
During this song, Fiyero sings about "the brainless", "skimming the surface", and not thinking, hinting at his later transformation into the Scarecrow. Also in this song, Nessarose begins to sing about her love for Boq, which will eventually lead to his transformation into the Tin Woodman by Nessarose using Elphaba's book, in her attempt to make him love her.

Songs from Wicked (musical)
Vocal collaborations
Songs written by Stephen Schwartz (composer)
2003 songs
Idina Menzel songs
Kristin Chenoweth songs